The Aurora Apartment Hotel (or simply the Aurora Hotel) is a historic, high-rise building located in the Tobin Hill neighborhood in San Antonio, Texas. The building is twelve stories high and the exterior is in the Neo-Gothic architectural style. The building was listed on the National Register of Historic Places on July 14, 2021.

On August 24, 1930, the Aurora opened its doors as one of San Antonio's grandest hotels of the time. The Aurora catered to the well-known and the well-to-do of the day, including Hollywood elite and former First Lady Mamie Geneva Doud Eisenhower.

In September 2007, Loopy, Ltd., a real estate company, purchased the Aurora building. Today, the Aurora is a 105-unit apartment complex, occupied almost exclusively by elderly and mentally and physically disabled residents. The Aurora is part of a list of qualifying properties for San Antonio's Section 8 housing. Due to its highly government-subsidized nature, the Aurora always enjoys 100% occupancy and a long wait list for new tenants.

References

External links

Hotel buildings completed in 1930
Defunct hotels in Texas
Residential skyscrapers in San Antonio
Hotel buildings on the National Register of Historic Places in Texas
National Register of Historic Places in San Antonio